On 22 January 2023 in Makugwe in the Democratic Republic of the Congo, Islamists killed about 20 people.

Background
The Allied Democratic Forces are a Ugandan Islamist group who began an insurgency in 1996. It spread to the DRC and intensified during the 2010s. Their attacks in North Kivu include a massacre in Beni in 2016. During the late 2010s, they group forged close links to the Islamic State. They bombed a church in Kasindi, North Kivu on 15 January 2023.

Attack
On the evening of 22 January 2023, the Allied Democratic Forces killed between 17 and 24 people in Makugwe, a village near Beni, North Kivu, in the east of the Democratic Republic of the Congo. The massacre occurred at a bar; the insurgents also looted and set fire to several homes and shops, and kidnapped several people. Provincial deputy Saidi Balikwisha, who was in Makugwe during the attack, claimed the death toll to be 23 and stated at least 3 others are reported missing. On 23 January, Islamic State claimed responsibility for the attack.

References

2023 murders in the Democratic Republic of the Congo
21st-century mass murder in Africa
Attacks on bars
January 2023 crimes in Africa
January 2023 events in the Democratic Republic of the Congo
Islamic terrorist incidents in 2023
North Kivu